There are sixty-two schools in , one of the three provinces of Libertador General Bernardo O'Higgins Region in Chile. The province contains several primary schools and eight secondary schools. Most schools are located in rural areas, while twenty are located in urban areas. All of them are coeducational.

As of 2020, the number of students in the province slightly increased to 7,724.

Schools
The enrollments given here are based on figures from the 2020 school year provided by the Ministry of Education. Thirty-nine schools without students are not included.

References
General
 
 
 

Specific

Schools in Cardenal
Education in O'Higgins Region
 
Cardenal Caro